(internally designated  in the context of the Hubble Space Telescope, and 7 in the context of the New Horizons mission) is a cold classical Kuiper belt object (KBO) and was formerly a potential flyby target for the New Horizons probe.

Discovery and naming 
 was discovered by the New Horizons KBO Search with the help of the Hubble Space Telescope (HST) because the object has a magnitude of 27.3, which is too faint to be observed by ground-based telescopes. Preliminary observations by the HST searching for KBO flyby targets for the New Horizons probe started in June 2014, and more intensive observations continued in July and August.  was first discovered in observations on June 24, 2014, during the preliminary observations, but it was designated 0720090F at the time, nicknamed "7" for short. Its existence as a potential target of the New Horizons probe was revealed by NASA in October 2014, but the official name  was not assigned by the Minor Planet Center (MPC) until March 2015 after better orbit information was available. The parameters of the orbit have the extremely large uncertainty of 9 because follow-up observations after discovery eliminated  as a potential target of the New Horizons probe, and no further follow-up observations were made.

Potential targets of the New Horizons mission 
After having completed its flyby of Pluto, the New Horizons space probe was maneuvered for a flyby of at least one Kuiper belt object (KBO). Several targets were considered for the first such flyby. Potential target PT2, the KBO , was eliminated for consideration as a potential target.

On 28 August 2015, the New Horizons team announced the selection of Arrokoth as the next flyby target.

See also 
 List of minor planets and comets visited by spacecraft
 List of missions to minor planets
 List of New Horizons topics

References

External links 
 

Kuiper belt objects
Minor planet object articles (unnumbered)

Discoveries using the Hubble Space Telescope
New Horizons
20140624